Konstanty Wileński (born Kostyantyn Mykhailovych Vilensky  25 December 1949 in Kyiv, Ukrainian SSR, Soviet Union) is a Ukrainian and Polish pianist, composer and jazz musician.

Born to a family of Kiev musicians, he is a grandson (by adoption) of Illya Vilensky (1896–1975), the first director of the Kiev Philharmonic Hall and founder of three musical theaters. His parents, Mykhailo Vilensky and Yelyzaveta Rostkovska, were choreographers. In 1974 he graduated from the Kiev Conservatory and in 1978 completed his postgraduate studies at the same Conservatorium. Since 1983 he was a lecturer of harmony, orchestration, and composition in the same conservatoire. In 1995–2001 he was a musical director of the Stefan Żeromski Theater in Kielce (Poland). He has twelwe albums of his own musical works.

Since 1995 he has resided in Kielce, Poland, and he obtained Polish citizenship in 2002.

References

External links
 Personal site (in English and Polish)
 

1949 births
Living people
Musicians from Kyiv
Polish composers
Polish conductors (music)
Male conductors (music)
Polish jazz musicians
Ukrainian composers
Ukrainian jazz musicians
21st-century conductors (music)
21st-century male musicians
Male jazz musicians